Zdeněk Černický (7 January 1914 – ?) was a Czechoslovak canoeist who took part in the 1936 Summer Olympics. In 1936 he and his partner Jaroslav Humpál finished eighth in the K-2 10000 metres competition.

References
Zdeněk Černický's profile at Sports Reference.com

1914 births
Canoeists at the 1936 Summer Olympics
Czechoslovak male canoeists
Olympic canoeists of Czechoslovakia
Year of death missing